Data-informed decision-making (DIDM) gives reference to the collection and analysis of data to guide decisions that improve success. Another form of this process is referred to as Data-Driven Decision-making, "which is defined similarly as making decisions based on hard data as opposed to intuition, observation, or guesswork." DIDM is used in education communities (where data is used with the goal of helping students and improving curricula) and is also used in other fields in which data is used to inform decisions. While "data based decision-making" is a more common term, "data-informed decision-making" is the preferred term, since decisions should not be based solely on quantitative data. Data-driven decision-making is most often seen in the context of business growth and entrepreneurship. Most educators have access to a data system for the purpose of analyzing student data. These data systems present data to educators in an over-the-counter data format (embedding labels, supplemental documentation, and a help system, making key package/display and content decisions) to improve the success of educators’ data-informed decision-making. In business, fostering and actively supporting DIDM in their firm and among their colleagues may be one of the central responsibilities of CIOs (Chief Information Officers) or CDOs (Chief Data Officers).

Assessment in higher education is a form of DIDM aimed at using evidence of what students learn to improve curriculum, student learning, and teaching. Standardized tests, grades, and student work scored by rubrics are forms of student learning outcomes assessment. Formative assessments, specifically, allow educators to use the data from student performances more immediately in modifying teaching and learning strategies. There are numerous organizations aimed at promoting the assessment of student learning through DIDM including the National Institute for Learning Outcomes Assessment, the Association for the Assessment of Student Learning in Higher Education, and, to an extent, the Association of American Colleges and Universities.

References

Data analysis
Standards-based education